Lemyra jankowskii is a moth of the family Erebidae. It was described by Oberthür in 1881.
It is found in China (Sichuan, Shaanxi, Shanxi, Jiangsu, Zhejiang, Yunnan, Heilongjiang, Liaonin, Hebei, Shandong, Tibet, Jilin, Beijing, Qinghai, Hubei, Guangxi), south-eastern Russia and the southern Kuriles. The species is named after the collector Michał Jankowski from whose specimens it was described.

Subspecies 
Lemyra jankowskii jankowskii (Russia, the Kuriles, China: Heilongjiang, Liaonin, Jilin, Shandong)
Lemyra jankowskii soror (Leech, 1899) (Sichuan, Yunnan, Tibet, Shaanxi, Shanxi, Jiangsu, Zhejiang, Hebei, Beijing, Qinghai, Hubei, Guangxi)

References

 Natural History Museum Lepidoptera generic names catalog

jankowskii
Moths described in 1881